Batalha Municipality may refer to:
Batalha Municipality, Portugal
Batalha, Alagoas, municipality in Alagoas, Brazil
Batalha, Piauí, municipality in Piauí, Brazil

Municipality name disambiguation pages